Quarry Visitor Center, in Dinosaur National Monument in Utah was built as part of the National Park Service's Mission 66 program of modern architectural design in the US national parks.  This visitor center exemplifies the philosophy of locating visitor facilities immediately at the resource being interpreted.  The visitor center was closed from 2006 to 2011 due to structural damage from unstable soils. The rotunda structure was demolished and replaced with a new structure of different design, while the quarry section was being stabilized and repaired.

Design
The visitor center was built in part to attract visitors to the little-visited monument, which had been threatened with flooding by the Echo Park Dam, as a means of guarding against renewed reservoir proposals.   The visitor center's concept was first expressed in 1916 when George Otis Smith, the director of the U.S. Geological Survey, suggested that the specimens be displayed in the  northern canyon wall. Local citizens, including the dinosaur quarry's discoverer Earl Douglass, proposed a skylit shelter for the display. A temporary shelter for the bones and their excavators was finally built in 1936. A preliminary design in January 1937  was produced by a group including the Park Service Western Office of Design and Construction, the American Museum of Natural History and the directorate of the Park Service that closely resembled the eventual design by Anshen and Allen. A number of succeeding designs followed, becoming more elaborate and departing from this concept. No funding emerged for the design, but a new wood and corrugated sheet metal shelter was built in 1951, reminiscent of the 1916 proposal.

The Quarry Visitor Center was declared a National Historic Landmark in 2001.

See also

 List of National Historic Landmarks in Utah
 National Register of Historic Places listings in Uintah County, Utah

References

External links

 Quarry Visitor Center
 

Mission 66
National Historic Landmarks in Utah
Buildings and structures in Uintah County, Utah
National Park Service visitor centers
National Register of Historic Places in Dinosaur National Monument
Tourist attractions in Uintah County, Utah
Park buildings and structures on the National Register of Historic Places in Utah
Historic American Buildings Survey in Utah
National Register of Historic Places in Uintah County, Utah